Clouds were a 1960s Scottish rock band that disbanded in October 1971. The band consisted of Ian Ellis (bass and lead vocals), Harry Hughes (drums) and Billy Ritchie (keyboards).

Biography

Early days: The Premiers 
In early 1964, Ian Ellis and Harry Hughes were playing in a band called The Premiers. The band itself consisted of Bill Lawrence (bass guitar), James ‘Shammy’ Lafferty (rhythm guitar), Derek Stark (lead guitar), Harry Hughes (drums) (born 5 August 1944) and Ian Ellis (vocals) (born Ian John Ellis, 7 October 1943). It was decided that an organ would help the sound of the band, and Billy Ritchie (born 20 April 1944) joined.

Cyril Stapleton took the band to London to record some demos, but nothing came of that, and Derek Stark, Bill Lawrence, and James Lafferty decided to leave. It seemed that Ritchie joining the band had prompted more changes than had been intended. Ian Ellis decided that he would take up the position of bass guitarist as well as lead vocalist. The group decided to move in a new musical direction, and changed their name from The Premiers to 1-2-3.

1-2-3 
1-2-3 had a very different sound from the previous band, or from almost any other band at that time. After achieving little success in Scotland, the band moved to London, England where they hoped that their original music would catch on, but early audiences were confused by the lack of a guitarist.

The band were given a now-legendary headlining residency performing at the Marquee Club, attended by future prog-rock icons such as Rick Wakeman and Keith Emerson. That an unknown band was chosen to headline at the Marquee was unusual, as they hadn't first performed the customary support spots. Although Clouds did support Yes at the Marquee on at least one occasion,  At the time, they were described as "a unique group...who have created an entirely new sound in pop group music". The same publication referred to "the truly exciting nature of 1-2-3". Tamla Motown was the order of the day, but this band offered up a potent mix of blues, classics, pop, and scat-jazz, wrapped in arrangements that defied categorisation. Their set consisted of original songs and standards, but these latter pieces were studiously reshaped to become, in essence, new. It anticipated the techniques later used by America's Vanilla Fudge, but where the US group slowed their creations down for melodramatic emphasis, 1-2-3 were more concerned with swing, and used the pieces as stepping stones to self-expression, rather than a means in themselves. Yet they balanced this esoteric desire with a conspicuous focus on melody. There was nothing remotely like it around.

During the time the group performed at the club during 1967, they were signed by NEMS management company and Brian Epstein of The Beatles fame. This event was heralded in the national press, complete with photograph and accompanying article.

Among the Marquee audience was future superstar David Bowie, who said, when interviewed by Record Mirror in 1967, that they were "three thistle and haggis voiced bairns [who] had the audacity to face a mob of self-opinionated hippies with a brand of unique pop music which, because of its intolerance of mediocrity, floated, as would a Hogarth cartoon in Beano". It was around this time Ritchie introduced the then-unknown Bowie to Jimi Hendrix. Later, in 1994, speaking about the 1-2-3 treatment of his own song ("I Dig Everything"), Bowie said that "the song was radically altered, yet retained its heart and soul". He said he regarded Billy Ritchie as "a genius". Pete Townshend, in his 2012 autobiography Who I Am, cites 1-2-3 as one of the bands he most wants to see.

The death of Brian Epstein, founder of NEMS, left the band in the care of Robert Stigwood, his successor. But Stigwood had just signed The Bee Gees, fellow Australians, and was preoccupied with making them a success. This brought an end to the management relationship shortly afterwards. After parting company with NEMS, the band kept busy playing in the local London club circuit. At a club in Ilford, east London, the band were seen by Terry Ellis who quickly signed them to his new agency, and renamed the band Clouds.

Clouds 
Originally known as the Ellis-Wright agency, the organisation grew and became Chrysalis. Clouds had also risen in prominence, playing many major tours, and appearing at the Royal Albert Hall and many of the headlining concert venues in the world, including the Fillmore East in New York. The band released a number of albums during this period. The recordings were generally very well received by the critics, with respectable sales.  Concert reviews were also favourable. A Billboard magazine review of a 1970 concert at the Arragon ballroom, Chicago, began by saying 'This band will be a giant.' 

But despite some initial success for the band, Chrysalis increasingly focused its attention on Jethro Tull, and the momentum that began with 1-2-3 was lost. Though the later incarnation, Clouds, was still interesting, invention was now part of the mainstream, and the group disbanded in October 1971, unable to find a niche in an overcrowded progressive rock scene. As years passed, however, it was the band's earlier incarnation as 1-2-3 that became the subject of a critical reappraisal. Ritchie, the organist, was credited as being the first of his kind, standing and taking a lead role, paving the way for others, such as  Keith Emerson and Rick Wakeman. With accolades from the likes of David Bowie and others, the band's distinctive guitar-less, organ-driven sound is now viewed as a definitive precursor to the progressive rock movement.

Discography

{|class="wikitable"
!Date of release
!Title
!Record label
|-
|1969
|Make No Bones About It b/w "Heritage" (single)
|Island WIP6055
|-
|1969
|You Can All Join In (compilation)
|Island IWPS2
|-
|1969
|The Clouds Scrapbook (album)
|Island ILPS9100
|-
|1969
|Scrapbook b/w Carpenter (single)
|Island WIP6067
|-
|1969
|Scrapbook b/w Old Man (single)
|Island (European continent only)
|-
|1969
|The Best of Island (compilation)
|Island 88418Y (Netherlands only)
|-
|1969
|London Pop News (compilation)
|Island 88514UFY(Germany only)
|-
|1969
|Bumpers (compilation)
|Island  IDP1
|-
|1970
|Up Above Our Heads (album)
|Deram Records DES18044 (USA/Canada only)
|-
|1970
|Take Me To Your Leader b/w "Old Man" (single)
|Island (European continent only)6014017
|-
|1971
|Watercolour Days (album)
|Island/Chrysalis ILPS9151, Deram18058
|-
|1992
|Nice enough to Join in (CD reissue)
|Island IMCD150
|-
|1996
|Scrapbook/Watercolour Days (reissue)
|BGO/EMI BGOCD317
|-
|1999
|Coda
|Sunrise Records (private collection)
|-
|2002
|The Birth of Prog (1-2-3)
|Sunrise Records (private collection)
|-
|2005
|Strangely Strange but Oddly Normal (compilation box set)
|Island-Universal Records 9822950  
|-
|2008
|The Clouds Scrapbook (reissue CD & Download)
|Island-Universal Records 
|-
|2009
|Strangely Strange but Oddly Normal(compilation box set reissue)
|Universal UMC8472 
|-
|2010
|Up Above our Heads(Clouds 1966-71) (2CD anthology)
|BGO/EMI BGOCD966
|-
|2017
|The Clouds Scrapbook (mini CD reissue)
|Belle172832
|-
|2017
|Up Above our Heads (mini CD reissue)
|Belle172833
|-
|2017
|Watercolour Days" (mini CD reissue)
|Belle172834
|-
|2017
|Scrapbook (box set of 3 albums)
|Belle
|-
|2018
|The Clouds Scrapbook (digital release 20/4)
|Blue Raincoat
|-
|2018
|Up Above our Heads (digital release 20/4)
|Blue Raincoat
|-
|2018
|Watercolour Days (digital release 20/4)
|Blue Raincoat
|-
|2018
|Up Above our Heads [Clouds 1966-71]'' (digital release 20/4)
|Blue Raincoat
|}

References

External links

Scottish rock music groups
British progressive rock groups
Musical groups established in 1968
Island Records artists
Deram Records artists
Chrysalis Records artists